Isaac Newton Coggs (June 5, 1920 – April 8, 1973) was an American Democratic politician and civil rights leader from Wisconsin. Coggs was the second African American State Representative to Chair a Wisconsin Legislative committee (the first being LeRoy J. Simmons, 1945-1952). He was the first African American member of the Milwaukee County Board of Supervisors.

Early life and career
Born in Muskogee, Oklahoma, Coggs graduated from the University of Wisconsin–Madison and served in the United States Army during World War II. Coggs was an accountant by trade, and served as President of the Northside Milwaukee Businessmen's Association, member of the YMCA Board, American Legion, and Disabled American Veterans. He served in the Wisconsin State Assembly from 1953 to 1964, and then the Milwaukee County Board of Supervisors from 1964 until 1968.

During his time in the legislature, Coggs served as chairman of the Assembly Public Welfare Committee, as well as a member of the Revision Committee and Civil War Centennial Committee.

Civil rights legislation
In June 1961, Coggs introduced a Humans Rights bill in the Wisconsin Assembly with two civil rights provisions: a fair housing law and a plan to reform fair employment practices. Though Wisconsin Governor Gaylord Nelson supported the bill, it was met with resistance in committee, facing amendments to defeat or weaken it. The state National Association for the Advancement of Colored People called for a protest in response to the opposition to the bill on the steps of the Wisconsin State Capitol building. Seven hundred mostly supporters participated in nonviolent protests throughout the summer. On August 11, the bill was defeated in the assembly. Coggs was disappointed by his Democratic colleagues for their rejection of his legislation, stating that, "We have a case of Dixiecrats. The Mason-Dixon line may be just south of Wisconsin Avenue."

Coggs had a friendly relationship with President John F. Kennedy. Kennedy told Coggs that a picture of him hung in his office.

Awards and honors
In 1978, Milwaukee Health Services, Inc. rededicated one of their health centers to be known as the "Isaac Coggs Heritage Health Center."

In 2017 Wisconsin Senate Joint Resolution 7, Coggs was honored for his service to the state.

Notes

Politicians from Muskogee, Oklahoma
Politicians from Milwaukee
Military personnel from Milwaukee
University of Wisconsin–Madison alumni
County supervisors in Wisconsin
Democratic Party members of the Wisconsin State Assembly
1920 births
1973 deaths
African-American history of Milwaukee
African-American state legislators in Wisconsin
20th-century American politicians
20th-century African-American politicians
African-American men in politics
United States Army personnel of World War II